Eupithecia daemionata is a moth in the family Geometridae. It is found in Russia, Japan and Taiwan.

References

Moths described in 1903
daemionata
Moths of Asia